Tomás Regalado may refer to:

 Tomás Pedro Regalado (born 1947), retired American politician and former Mayor of Miami, Florida
 Tomás Regalado (Salvadoran politician) (1861–1906), former President of El Salvador

See also
Regalado (surname)